Ta Mok (born Chhit Choeun, ; 1924 – 21 July 2006), also known as Nguon Kang, was a Cambodian military chief and soldier who was a senior figure in the Khmer Rouge and the leader of the national army of Democratic Kampuchea. He was best known as "Brother Number Four" or "the Butcher". He was captured along the Thailand-Cambodia border in March 1999 by Cambodian government forces while on the run with a small band of followers and was held in government custody until his death in 2006 while awaiting his war crime trial.

Early life

The eldest of seven children, he is believed to have been born into a prosperous country family from Pra Keap village, Trapeang Thom commune, Tram Kak district, Takeo Province, and was of Chinese-Cambodian descent. He became a Buddhist monk in the 1930s but left the order at the age of 16.

Ta Mok took part in the resistance against French colonial rule and then the anti-Japanese resistance during the 1940s. He was training to become a Bhikkhu in Pali, Cambodia when he joined the anti-French Khmer Issarak in 1952. He soon left Phnom Penh and joined the Khmer Rouge/Communist Party of Kampuchea (CPK).

In Khmer Rouge
By the late 1960s he was a general and the Khmer Rouge's chief-of-staff. He was also a member of the Standing Committee of the Khmer Rouge's Central Committee ("Party Centre") during its period in power. He became very powerful within the party, especially in the south-west zone. He was named by Pol Pot as leader of the national army of Democratic Kampuchea. He lost the lower part of one leg in fighting around 1970 during the Cambodian Civil War.

Ta Mok orchestrated several massacres within the territories that he captured from 1973, beginning before the final, complete seizure of power by the Khmer Rouge on 17 April 1975. For example, his and Ke Pauk's soldiers had 20,000 civilians murdered or forced into slave labour after capturing Oudong in March 1974.

He was also responsible for directing the massive purges that characterised the short-lived Democratic Kampuchea (1975–1979), including the mass killing of 30,000 people in the Angkor Chey district, earning him the nickname Butcher.

After the fall of the Khmer Rouge

After the regime was overthrown in 1979, Ta Mok remained a powerful figure, controlling the northern area of the Khmer Rouge's remaining territory from his base at Anlong Veng in the Dângrêk Mountains. It is estimated that some 3,000 to 5,000 combatants remained loyal to Pol Pot and were directed by Ta Mok.

In 1997, after a split in the party, Ta Mok seized control of one faction and named himself supreme commander. Pol Pot then fled the Khmer Rouge's northern stronghold, but was later arrested and sentenced to lifelong house arrest. In April 1998, after a new government attack, Ta Mok fled into the forest and took Pol Pot with him. A few days later, on 15 April 1998, Pol Pot died in custody.

On 25 July 1997, Ta Mok and Pol Pot were interviewed separately by Nate Thayer. Unrepentant, Mok chuckled as he debated whether the KR had killed millions of people or just "hundreds of thousands," claiming that he had only killed Vietnamese.

In 1998, after several key defections, Ta Mok was forced to flee to Anlong Veng. On 6 March 1999, the general was captured by the Cambodian army near the Thai border and brought to Phnom Penh, where he joined former comrade Khang Khek Ieu ("Comrade Duch") at the Military Prosecution Department Detention Facility. Ta Mok was the last leading member of the Khmer Rouge to remain at large in Cambodia; other senior figures had died or already made immunity deals with the government of Hun Sen, including Nuon Chea, Khieu Samphan and Ieng Sary.

In prison his detention period was repeatedly extended without his being brought to trial. Under Cambodian law his trial should have begun within six months of his arrest. First charged with membership of an outlawed group and tax evasion, in February 2002 he was charged with crimes against humanity. In poor health, suffering especially from respiratory problems, Ta Mok's only releases from solitary confinement were for hospital visits. On 21 July 2006, due to heart complications caused by the stress of the upcoming trial, he died in a military hospital after falling into a coma.

References

Further reading

External links

1924 births
2006 deaths
People from Takéo province
Cambodian politicians of Chinese descent
Cambodian communists
Cambodian criminals
Warlords
Khmer Rouge party members
Cambodian politicians with disabilities
People indicted by the Khmer Rouge Tribunal
Cambodian prisoners and detainees
Prisoners and detainees of Cambodia
Communist Party of Kampuchea politicians
Cambodian people who died in prison custody
Prisoners who died in Cambodian detention
Former Buddhists
Cambodian atheists
Genocide perpetrators